Villem Ernits (16 July 1891 Pala Parish (now Peipsiääre Parish), Kreis Dorpat – 10 May 1982 Tartu) was an Estonian politician. He was a member of Estonian Constituent Assembly.

References

1891 births
1982 deaths
People from Peipsiääre Parish
People from Kreis Dorpat
Estonian Social Democratic Workers' Party politicians
Members of the Estonian Constituent Assembly
Members of the Riigikogu, 1920–1923
University of Tartu alumni
Academic staff of the University of Tartu